Steen Raskopoulos (born 3 July 1987) is an Australian comedian, actor and improviser. He is best known for his live character solo sketch shows, playing Dr. Evan in The Duchess (Netflix), Pete Lewis in Feel Good (Netflix), John Mahogany in BBC Three's Top Coppers, Whose Line Is It Anyway? Australia and as one half of the award-winning improvisation duo The Bear Pack.

Early life and education
Raskopoulos was born in Sydney. His father is FFA Hall of Fame footballer Peter Raskopoulos and his sister is comedian and singer Jordan Raskopoulos. He studied at the University of Sydney where he first started improvising and performed Theatresports at Manning Bar. He is the co-founder of Improv Theatre Sydney.

Live comedy career 
Raskopoulos debuted his first solo sketch show Bruce springSTEEN LIVE IN CONCERT at the 2013 Melbourne International Comedy Festival. He was nominated for Best Newcomer, and won the same award at the Sydney Comedy Festival later that year. In 2014, he returned with a new show, I'm Wearing Two Suits Because I Mean Business. He sold out his seasons in Melbourne, Sydney, London and Edinburgh and was nominated for the Fosters Comedy Awards Best Newcomer at the Edinburgh Fringe Festival.  Character Assassin earned him a Barry Award nomination for best show at the Melbourne International Comedy Festival. He won the Directors Choice award at the 2018 Sydney Comedy Festival for his solo sketch show 'Stay'. Raskopoulos is also the youngest Theatresports National Champion of Australia, winning the title in 2008 with Simon Greiner and two members from The Axis of Awesome, Jordan Raskopoulos and Lee Naimo.

Television career 
Raskopoulos has starred on the sketch show This is Littleton (ABC), SlideShow (Channel 7), Legally Brown (SBS), It's a Date (ABC), The Code (ABC), Utopia (ABC), True Story with Hamish & Andy (Nine) Whose Line Is It Anyway? Australia (Comedy Channel), Squinters (ABC), Feel Good (Netflix), The Duchess (Netflix), Out of Her Mind (BBC 1) and lead in the BBC Three sitcom Top Coppers

Personal life 
Raskopoulos has been married to the British comedian Sara Pascoe since 2020. The couple have a son (born February 2022).

Filmography

Film

Television

Video games

Awards and nominations 
 2008 National Theatresports Champion
 2013 Best Newcomer Sydney Comedy Festival
 2013 Best Newcomer Nomination Melbourne International Comedy Festival
 2014 Best Newcomer Nomination Edinburgh Fringe Festival
 2014 Sydney Fringe Laughs Award (The Bear Pack)
 2014 Australian Writers Guild Comedy - Sketch or Light Entertainment This Is Littleton (2014)
 2015 Best Newcomer Nomination Chortle Awards
 2015 Best Character/Sketch Nomination Chortle Awards
 2015 Barry Award Nomination Melbourne International Comedy Festival
 2018 Directors Choice Award Sydney Comedy Festival

References

External links

1987 births
Living people
Australian male comedians
Male actors from Sydney
Australian male television actors
Comedians from Sydney
21st-century Australian male actors
21st-century Australian comedians